The canton of Noisiel is a French former administrative division, located in the arrondissement of Torcy, in the Seine-et-Marne département (Île-de-France région). It was disbanded following the French canton reorganisation which came into effect in March 2015. It consisted of 2 communes, which joined the canton of Champs-sur-Marne in 2015.

Demographics

Composition 
The canton of Noisiel was composed of 2 communes:
Lognes
Noisiel

See also
Cantons of the Seine-et-Marne department
Communes of the Seine-et-Marne department

References

Noisiel
2015 disestablishments in France
States and territories disestablished in 2015